Absalyamovo (Äbsäläm) is a village in Mansurovsky Selsoviet, Uchalinsky District, Bashkortostan, Russia. The population was 89 as of 2010. There are 3 streets.

Geography 
Absalyamovo is located 47 km north of Uchaly (the district's administrative centre) by road. Voznesenka is the nearest rural locality.

Ethnicity 
The village is inhabited by Bashkirs.

References 

Rural localities in Uchalinsky District